Sub Verses  is the sixth and final studio album by experimental rock band Akron/Family. It was released on April 30, 2013, on Dead Oceans Records.

Recording and release
The album was recorded in Seattle and El Paso and was produced by Randall Dunn.

Reception

Sub Verses has received generally positive reviews so far.

Thom Jurek of Allmusic praised the album, writing "Sub Verses offers such a disciplined sense of exploration, multivalent nuance, and commitment in its production and performance; it stands out in an already very distinguished catalog." This Is Fake DIY's Anna Byrne wrote that while "Some of the extremes on the album feel awkward - the heavy metal too heavy, the loops of death overlooped, the calm too suddenly silent," Sub Verses is "a deep, yawning collection of exciting musical experiments to dunk yourself into."

Jordan Mainzer gave Sub Verses a mixed review, writing "Sub Verses may be genre hopping, but it’s not a particularly challenging listen as compared to its predecessors, albums that were both challenging and fun."

Track listing

Personnel
The following people contributed to Sub Verses:

Akron/Family
	Dana Janssen 	
	Seth Olinsky 	
	Miles Seaton

Additional personnel
	Randall Dunn 	-	Engineer, Mixing, Producer
	Michael Gira 	-	Quotation Author
	Charles Godfrey 	-	Assistant Engineer
	Eyvind Kang 	-	String Arrangements
	Jason Kardong 	-	Pedal Steel
	Jessika Kenney 	-	Vocals
	TJ Nelson 	-	Band Photo
	Stephen O'Malley	-	Design
	Leanne Pedante 	-	Vocals
	Robert Pinsky 	-	Composer, Lyricist
	Skerik 	-	Horn
	Jason Ward 	-	Mastering

References

External links
Sub Verses page on Dead Oceans

Akron/Family albums
2013 albums
Dead Oceans albums
Albums recorded at Sonic Ranch